The Joker is a Honda scooter made from 1996 to 1999.

History
The Honda Joker scooter was first launched in 1996 in Japan. Then in Europe and the US, where it was renamed the Honda SRX50/90 Shadow, which came in two versions respectively which had either a 50cc or 90cc two-stroke engine.

Concept
The design concept was based on being used for basic transportation, and the Custom-motorcycles of the US.

References

See also
 Znen C Artemis
 Aprilia mojito
 Flyscooters Il Bello

Joker
Motor scooters
Two-stroke motorcycles